Birtles is a surname. Notable people with the surname include:

 Beeb Birtles, Dutch-Australian musician
Bill Birtles, Australian journalist
 Francis Birtles, Australian adventurer
 Fred Birtles, English footballer
 Garry Birtles, English footballer
 Jasmine Birtles, British journalist and presenter

See also
 Birtles Shorrock Goble, a music group featuring three original members of Little River Band
 Birtles & Goble, an Australian music duo